= Holy Cross Procession =

Holy Cross Procession may refer to one of the following:

- Via Crucis (Latin, "Way of the Cross"), a devotional tradition of Roman Catholicism, Anglican, and Lutheranism.
- An outdoor procession headed by a large cross in the Byzantine tradition.
